John Bradbury, 3rd Baron Bradbury (born 1940, of Winsford in the County of Chester), is a British peer, the third holder of the title Baron Bradbury.

Background and education
The grandson of John Swanwick Bradbury, 1st Baron Bradbury, Permanent Secretary to HM Treasury, he was educated at Gresham's School, Holt, and the University of Bristol.

Family
The present Lord Bradbury succeeded his father John Bradbury, 2nd Baron Bradbury (1914–1994), in 1994. He married Susan Liddiard in 1968, and they have two sons. The elder son, John Timothy Bradbury, born 16 January 1973, is heir to the title.

Arms

References

 Debrett's Peerage and Baronetage, 1990 edition, ed. Charles Kidd and David Williamson (St Martin's Press, New York, 1990)
 Who's Who 2003 (A. & C. Black, London, 2003) page 241

1940 births
Living people
People educated at Gresham's School
Alumni of the University of Bristol
3
People from Winsford
Bradbury